Jake McGuire (born September 3, 1994) is an American soccer player who plays as a goalkeeper for Miami FC in the USL Championship.

Early life and education
McGuire played in the youth ranks of Major League Soccer side Chivas USA. He also trained with the Chivas USA first team.

McGuire played for the University of Tulsa's Division I men's soccer team, and was named to the NSCAA Third-Team All-East Region and the American Athletic Conference All-Tournament Team during his senior season. While at the University of Tulsa between 2013 and 2016, he started all four years, made 67 appearances, and concluded his career ranked first in career shutouts, minutes played, and games played. He tallied 17 shutouts (school record). He was on the All-Academic Team from 2014–2017. While at college, McGuire also appeared for Premier Development League sides OC Pateadores Blues and Portland Timbers U23s.

Club career

Professional
On January 13, 2017, McGuire was selected 30th overall in the 2017 MLS SuperDraft by Houston Dynamo. While with Houston during the 2017 preseason, McGuire started a scrimmage against the Colorado Rapids (February 25), helping keep a clean sheet over 65 minutes of play. He also appeared in a friendly for Rio Grande Valley FC against the Dynamo in an intra-squad scrimmage (February 7). McGuire signed with Philadelphia Union on March 10, 2017, after his rights were waived by Houston.

Philadelphia Union
McGuire never played a league match with the Union. Throughout his career with the Union, he was listed as a substitute on 14 occasions but did not see any minutes on the pitch. However, he was in the starting lineup for a club friendly on July 15, 2017, against Swansea City.

Bethlehem Steel
McGuire made his professional debut on April 9, 2017, while on loan with the Union's United Soccer League affiliate Bethlehem Steel. McGuire played 90 minutes in a 2–0 win over FC Cincinnati. He established himself as the starting goalkeeper during his tenure with the Bethlehem Steel. He currently holds the club's record for career Saves, Shutouts, Wins, Minutes, and Games Played.

Gefle IF
On January 21, 2019, McGuire signed with Gefle IF as a free transfer competing in Division 1 Norra. He has appeared in 30 games collecting 7 clean sheets.

Örebro SK
After a successful season at Gefle IF in 2019, McGuire was offered a contract with Allsvenskan side, Örebro SK, for the 2020 season.

North Carolina FC
In March 2021, McGuire joined North Carolina FC in USL League One.

Miami FC
On January 26, 2022, McGuire joined USL Championship side Miami FC.

International career
McGuire was a member of the United States under-17 national team with its residency program from 2010–2011 in Bradenton, FL. McGuire was a member of the U-17 residency program from 2010–2011. McGuire was a member of the United States under-20 national team in 2012.

References

External links 
 
 
 

1994 births
Living people
American soccer players
Association football goalkeepers
Tulsa Golden Hurricane men's soccer players
Houston Dynamo FC draft picks
OC Pateadores Blues players
People from Chino Hills, California
Portland Timbers U23s players
Philadelphia Union players
Philadelphia Union II players
Gefle IF players
Örebro SK players
North Carolina FC players
Miami FC players
Soccer players from California
USL Championship players
USL League Two players
Ettan Fotboll players
Expatriate footballers in Sweden
American expatriate soccer players
American expatriate sportspeople in Sweden